Bill Merritt may refer to:

Bill Merritt (cricketer) (1908–1977), New Zealand cricketer
Bill Merritt (catcher) (1870–1937), Major League Baseball catcher
Bill Merritt (pitcher) (1886–?), American Negro leagues baseball player

See also
William Merritt (disambiguation)